The Sassal Mason is a mountain in the Bernina Range of the Alps, overlooking the Lago Bianco and the Bernina Pass in the canton of Graubünden. It is situated at the eastern end of the Bernina Range, between the Engadin and the Val Poschiavo

References

External links

 Sassal Mason on Hikr

Bernina Range
Mountains of Graubünden
Mountains of the Alps
Alpine three-thousanders
Mountains of Switzerland